Grace Apiafi (born 27 November 1958) is a former track and field athlete from Nigeria, who competed in the shot put and discus throw events during her career. She represented her native West African country at the 1988 Summer Olympics in Seoul, South Korea, where she did not reach the final in either competition.

International competitions

External links

1958 births
Living people
Nigerian female shot putters
Nigerian female discus throwers
Olympic athletes of Nigeria
Athletes (track and field) at the 1988 Summer Olympics
Junior college women's track and field athletes in the United States